Ursinia is a genus of African plants in the  chamomile tribe within the daisy family. The genus is named in honor of German scholar Johannes Heinrich Ursinus 1608–1667.

Characteristics 
This genus consists of annual or perrenial herbs and shrubs.

Leaves 
The leaves are usually alternately with toothed margins.

Flowers 
The flowers are borne in round flower heads. They are usually medium sized or large, but may also rarely be small. Most species have long floral stems. There are many rows of bracts. These get shorter towards the outside.

The florets of the flowerheads are not all of the same sex. There is only one row of ray (outer) florets. The corolla is strap shaped. The blades of the petals may have three small teeth at the end.

The disc florets are bisexual, although those at the center may be sterile. The corolla has a slender tube that widens at the base.

The achenes (small, dry fruits that contain a single seed) have five to ten ridges and are narrower towards the base. The base may be surrounded by long hairs.

Distribution 
This species is currently known from Africa with 65 species in South Africa (mostly in coastal regions) and one species from the Ethiopian Empire.

Species
The following species are accepted:

References

Flora of Africa
Anthemideae
Asteraceae genera